Aamer Bashir (23 February 1972 – 20 December 2010) was a Pakistani first-class cricketer.

Cricket career 
He debuted in the 1989/90 season. He was a right-handed batsman who made over 8,000 runs in his career. For many years he was on the fringes of selection for Pakistan, but the closest he got to playing for his country was selection to the squad for a One Day International against India in 2005.
Played as Professional for Hollinwood C C and Uppermill CC in the UK.

Death 
Bashir died on 20 December 2010 following a long battle with stomach cancer. He was 38 years old.

References

External links 
 

1972 births
2010 deaths
Multan cricketers
Pakistan Customs cricketers
Pakistani cricketers
Pakistan Telecommunication Company Limited cricketers
Peshawar cricketers
Rawalpindi cricketers
United Bank Limited cricketers
Deaths from cancer in Pakistan
Rawalpindi B cricketers
Zarai Taraqiati Bank Limited cricketers
Cricketers from Multan
Deaths from stomach cancer